The Cum Laude Society is an organization that honors scholastic achievement at secondary institutions, similar to the Phi Beta Kappa Society, which honors scholastic achievements at the university level.  It was founded at The Tome School in 1906 as the Alpha Delta Tau fraternity and changed its name in the 1950s.  It presently has 382 chapters; all but 20 of these are at private or independent schools located in the United States.  Approximately 4,000 students are inducted each year.

Participating secondary institutions may nominate up to 20% of their graduating class for induction into the society.  The society's motto is Areté, Diké, Timé, which translates from Greek into "Excellence, Justice, Honor".

Chapters
The Cum Laude Society has 382 chapters in eight geographic districts across the United States and abroad.

See also
National Honor Society

References

External links
The Cum Laude Society

1906 establishments in Maryland
High school honor societies
Student organizations established in 1906